US Post Office-Endicott is an historic post office building located at Endicott in Broome County, New York.  It was designed and built in 1936 and is one of a number of post offices in New York State designed by a consulting architect for the Office of the Supervising Architect of the Treasury Department, Walter Whitlack. It is a one-story, nine bay steel frame, cream-colored brick clad building on a raised granite-clad foundation executed in the Colonial Revival style.  The interior features a 1938 mural titled "Excavating for the Ideal Factory" by Douglass Crockwell.

It was listed on the National Register of Historic Places in 1988.

References

Buildings and structures in Broome County, New York
Government buildings completed in 1936
National Register of Historic Places in Broome County, New York
Endicott
Colonial Revival architecture in New York (state)